Simister is a surname. Notable people with the surname include:

Meaghan Simister (born 1986), Canadian Olympic luger
Scott Simister (born 1973), Australian rules footballer